"No Place to Go" is a song by the alternative rock band My Bloody Valentine. It is the opening track and lead single from the band's debut extended play, Geek!, released in December 1985 on Fever Records. Featuring lyrics by vocalist David Conway and music by guitarist Kevin Shields, "No Place to Go" is considered the standout song on Geek! although Shields later referred to it as an "absolute failure" and "unrepresentative of what [My Bloody Valentine] wanted to do."

Track listing
All lyrics written by David Conway, all music composed by Kevin Shields.

UK 7" single (Fever Records, FEV 005X)
"No Place to Go" – 3:20
"Moonlight" – 3:20

Personnel
All personnel credits adapted from "No Place to Go"s liner notes.

My Bloody Valentine
David Conway – vocals
Kevin Shields – guitar, vocals
Debbie Googe – bass
Colm Ó Cíosóig – drums

Technical personnel
My Bloody Valentine – production
Martin Pavey – engineering

References

1985 songs
1985 singles
My Bloody Valentine (band) songs
Songs written by Kevin Shields